Nautilus macromphalus, the bellybutton nautilus, is a species of nautilus native to the waters off New Caledonia, the Loyalty Islands, and northeastern Australia. The shell of this species lacks a callus, leaving the umbilicus exposed, in which the inner coils of the shell are visible. This opening constitutes about 15% of the shell diameter at its widest point.

Like all Nautilus species, N. macromphalus usually lives at depths of several hundred metres. During the night, however, they rise to much shallower waters (2 to 20 m depth) to feed.

The tentacles of this species are long and thin, having raised ridges which help provide grip when catching prey. N. macromphalus is the smallest species of nautilus. The shell is usually up to around 16 cm in diameter, although the largest specimen ever recorded measured 180 mm.

More than 35 shells of N. macromphalus dating to around 6400–7100 years BP were found in a cenote on Lifou, the Loyalty Islands. Based on these radiocarbon dates  it is thought the cenote was connected to marine waters for some 700 years before becoming cut off completely. During this time nautiluses were able to enter it through a flooded karst system. Many of these animals apparently became trapped and died there.

References

 Norman, M. 2000. Cephalopods: A World Guide. Hackenheim, ConchBooks, p. 30.

External links

Nautiluses
Cephalopods of Australia
Molluscs described in 1848